The 2022–23 Kerala Premier League Qualifiers were played from 25 September to 5 October. A total of eleven teams competed to decide the remaining 3 of 22 places in the 2022–23 Kerala Premier League. The fixtures were announced on 20 September.

Teams
The following 11 teams (usually combination of district champions and lowest placed KPL teams previous season) entered the qualifying play-offs, consisting of four rounds:
6 teams entered in the preliminary round 1.
5 teams entered in the preliminary round 2.

Round 1

Round 2

Semi-finals

Final

Loosers-final

Goalscorers

References

Kerala Premier League seasons